Joan of Arc is a 2019 French drama film directed by Bruno Dumont and starring Lise Leplat Prudhomme. It is the sequel to Jeannette: The Childhood of Joan of Arc (2017). It was screened in the Un Certain Regard section at the 2019 Cannes Film Festival.

Plot
After her triumph against the English army, Joan of Arc is captured by the Burgundians. She is put on trial for heresy.

Cast
 Lise Leplat Prudhomme as Jeanne
 Jean-François Causeret as Monseigneur Pierre Cauchon
 Daniel Dienne as Maître Thomas de Courcelles
 Fabien Fenet as Maître Nicolas L'Oiseleur
 Robert Hanicotte as Messire Jean d'Estivet
 Yves Habert as Maître William Haiton
 Fabrice Luchini as Charles VII of France
 Christophe as Maître Guillaume Evrard

Release
The film had its premiere in the Un Certain Regard section at the 2019 Cannes Film Festival on 18 May 2019. It was released in France on 11 September 2019.

Reception

Critical reception
The website's critics consensus reads: "Joan of Arc (Jeanne) definitely offers a different take on this oft-told tale, although it isn't always able to deliver absorbing drama." On Metacritic, which assigns a normalized rating to reviews, the film has a weighted average score of 50 out of 100, based on eleven critics, indicating "mixed or average reviews".

Peter Bradshaw of The Guardian gave the film 2 out of 5 stars, writing, "I found this film ultimately exasperating: not quite funny enough to be funny, or serious enough to be serious, or passionate enough to be about the passion of Joan of Arc." Sam C. Mac of Slant Magazine praised Lise Leplat Prudhomme's performance, commenting that she "gives an extraordinarily committed, and convincing, performance as the teenaged Joan." Guy Lodge of Variety wrote, "Imposing by any generational measure, Prudhomme's fervid, unflinching performance puts some blood and guts into an otherwise stony, hyper-measured exercise."

Accolades

References

External links
 

2019 films
2019 drama films
2019 biographical drama films
2010s French-language films
French biographical drama films
French sequel films
Films directed by Bruno Dumont
Films about Joan of Arc
2010s French films